Grygov is a municipality and village in Olomouc District in the Olomouc Region of the Czech Republic. It has about 1,500 inhabitants.

Geography

Grygov lies on the Morava River. Near Grygov is a food-plain forest, protected by law as nature reserve Království and containing an oak-tree called Král ("The King"), which is about 400 years old.

History
The first written mention of Grygov is from 1306.

Economy
Farming is an important source of employment in the municipality.

Transport
Public transport in Grygov is provided by train and bus. Grygov lies on the railway line Olomouc–Přerov.

Notable people
Jan Šrámek (1870–1956), politician, Prime Minister and Roman Catholic Monsignore

References

External links

Villages in Olomouc District